Somawarpete taluk is one of the five taluks of Coorg district. Its administrative headquarters is in the town of Somwarpet.

Languages 

Kannada, Are Bhashe, Kodava Takk, Beary bashe and English are spoken by the people.

Flora and fauna 
Coffee is the major crop in the region. It is the major Arabica coffee growing region of India. Other crops like pepper, cardamom, orange, vanilla are grown. Rice, ginger is also grown.

Tourist attractions 
Beelur Golf Club 
Beelur Golf Club is located 8 km from Somwarpet town. The lush green golf ground attracts movie makers.

Malemalleshwara Betta
Malemalleshwara Betta is located 13 km from Somwarpet and 7 km from Shanivarsanthe. Pooja is conducted regularly and a Grand Celebration on Maha Shiva Rathri every year.

Kotebetta
Kotebetta is the third highest peak in Coorg after Tadiyandamol and Brahmagiri, Kotebetta means "Fort Hill" because of its fort-like appearance. Its height above sea level is 1620 metres (5313 ft). It lies near the border between the Dakshina Kannada and Coorg districts. The trek starting point is a junction near a bridge called Hattihole. The peak is 10 km from Hattihole. There is a Shiva temple at the base of Kotebetta.

Makkalagudi Betta is located in Kiraganduru 10 km between Somwarpet and Madikeri road. There is a view of paddy fields, forest, and the waters of the Harangi reservoir.

Mallalli Falls  (Kannada:ಮಲ್ಲಳ್ಳಿ ಜಲಪಾತ)
Mallalli Abbi or Kumaradhara Falls is one of the tallest waterfalls in the Coorg where the river Kumaradhara drops down 200 feet. Scattered along the stream are other misty waterfalls, situated on the foothills of the Pushpagiri hill-ranges, 25 km from Somwarpet.

"Beauty Spot" in mathanahaill, somwarpet, saniversante road. " Mountain Mist coffee valley"

See also 

 Madikeri
 Mangalore
 Virajpet
 Kushalanagar

References

Villages in Kodagu district